The 1929 Colorado Silver and Gold football team was an American football team that represented the University of Colorado as a member of the Rocky Mountain Conference (RMC) during the 1929 college football season. Led by tenth-year head coach Myron E. Witham, Colorado compiled an overall record of 5–1–1 with a mark of 4–1–1 in conference play, tying for second place in the RMC.

Schedule

References

Colorado
Colorado Buffaloes football seasons
Colorado Silver and Gold football